The Rural Municipality of Duck Lake No. 463 is a rural municipality (RM) in the Canadian province of Saskatchewan within Census Division No. 15 and  Division No. 5.

History 
The RM of Duck Lake No. 463 incorporated as a rural municipality on January 1, 1913.

Geography

Communities and localities 
The following urban municipalities are surrounded by the RM.

Towns
 Duck Lake

The following unincorporated communities are within the RM.

Organized hamlets
 MacDowall

Localities
 Lily Plain
 Titanic
 Wingard

Demographics 

Attractions 
The following attractions are located within this RM and surrounding area.
 North-West Rebellion
 Battle of Duck Lake
 Nisbet Trails
 St. Louis Ghost Train
 South Branch House Provincial Historic Site
 Duck Lake Regional Interpretive Centre
 Our Lady of Lourdes Shrine
 Batoche National Historic Site
 Valley Regional Park (Rosthern)
 Mennonite Heritage Village
 Seager Wheeler Farm Historic Site
 Nisbet Provincial Forest
 Frog Lake Massacre
 St. Laurent Ferry
 Wingard Ferry

Government 
The RM of Duck Lake No. 463 is governed by an elected municipal council and an appointed administrator that meets on the second Wednesday of every month. The reeve of the RM is Remi Martin while its administrator is Karen Baynton. The RM's office is located in Duck Lake.

Transportation 
 Saskatchewan Highway 11
 Saskatchewan Highway 212
 Saskatchewan Highway 302
 Saskatchewan Highway 782
 Saskatchewan Highway 783
 CTW Railway
 St. Laurent Ferry
 Wingard Ferry

See also 
List of rural municipalities in Saskatchewan

References 

D

Division No. 15, Saskatchewan